Chaim Yosef Gottlieb of Stropkov (1794 - March 11, 1867) (Hebrew: חיים יוסף גאטליב), known as the Stropkover Rov, was a student of Rabbi Moshe Schreiber and author of Tiv Gittin ve-Kiddushin, published by his sons Efroim & Menashe in Ungvar in 1868.

Upon completing his studies in 1813, he Married Reb. Breindel the daughter of the Wealthy Man R' Myir of Tarcal, 3915, Hungary. The Rabbi at that time in Tercal was the author of the holy book Mareh Yechezkel & later Rabbi of Karlsburg, and he appointed him to learn with some of his disciples, and his own children. In 1823 he was appointed Dayan and teacher in the town of his birth, Tertzal, Hungary and sometime later also as Rabbi, where he studied with his brother-in-law Rabbi Mordechai Ciment, and wrote extensively about Jewish law and Kabbalah. In 1841, - after the Author of the holy book Yeitev Lev left the Rabbinical Appointment of Stropkov For Satoraljaujhely Hungary, - he was appointed the Chief Rabbi and head of the Bet Din of Stropkov in 1847 at the recommendation of Rabbi Chaim Halberstam of Sanz.   Chaim Yosef died on Monday, 4 Adar II, 5627 / 11 March 1867 and is buried in the Tisinec cemetery.

There is a school in Jerusalem named after him called Yeshivas Rabbenu Chaim Yosef. They publish a book which lists all the descendants of Reb Chaim Yosef called Sefer Hayachas.

Notes and references 

The Rabbis of Stropkov
Stropkov Memorial Book
Arthur Kurzweil: How I discovered my Rabbinical Ancestry

1794 births
1867 deaths
19th-century Hungarian rabbis